The Union of Democrats "For Lithuania" (DSVL) is a Lithuanian political party founded on January 29, 2022 by Saulius Skvernelis, former Prime Minister of Lithuania. The party described itself as being centre-left on economic policy and centre-right on socio-cultural issues.

References

Political parties established in 2022
Centrist parties in Lithuania
Conservative parties in Lithuania
Green conservative parties
Green parties in Europe